In mathematics, a measure is said to be saturated if every locally measurable set is also measurable.  A set , not necessarily measurable, is said to be a  if for every measurable set  of finite measure,  is measurable.  -finite measures and measures arising as the restriction of outer measures are saturated.

References

Measures (measure theory)